Vixen is a superhero created by Gerry Conway and Bob Oksner. She first appeared in Action Comics #521 (July 1981), published by DC Comics. Through the Tantu Totem, which allows her to harness the spirit (ashe) of any animal, past or present, and use their abilities.

Two versions of the character appeared in The CW's Arrowverse. Original comic book character Mari McCabe debuted in the CW Seed animated series Vixen, voiced by Megalyn Echikunwoke, who also reprised her role in an episode of the live-action parent series, Arrow. Legends of Tomorrow introduced a World War II-era Vixen and Mari's grandmother, Amaya Jiwe, portrayed by Maisie Richardson-Sellers.

Publication history

Vixen was intended to be the first African female DC superhero to star in her own series, but the first issue of her series was cancelled in the DC Implosion in 1978, never to be released. The story was subsequently printed in Cancelled Comic Cavalcade.

Since her debut in Action Comics, she has primarily appeared in team books, most notably various incarnations of the Justice League and Suicide Squad.

In October 2008, G. Willow Wilson began a five-issue limited series, Vixen: Return of the Lion.

Character biography
In ancient Ghana, the warrior Tantu asked Anansi the Spider to create a totem that would give the wearer all of the powers of the animal kingdom, only if they would use the power to protect the innocent. Tantu used the totem to become Africa's first legendary hero. The totem was later passed down to Tantu's descendants until it reached the McCabes.

Growing up in a small village in the fictional nation of Zambesi, M'Changa province, Mari Jiwe McCabe heard the legend of the "Tantu Totem" from her mother. Sometime later, Mari's mother was killed by poachers and she was raised by her father Reverend Richard Jiwe, the village priest. Reverend Jiwe himself was killed by his half-brother (Mari's uncle) General Maksai. Maksai wanted the Tantu Totem, which Jiwe had possessed.

Mari ultimately moved to America, where she established an identity as Mari McCabe and worked as a model in New York City. She used her newfound wealth to travel the world. On a trip back to Africa, she came across her uncle and took back the Tantu Totem, using its power to become the costumed superhero Vixen.

Fighting crime
Vixen made only two appearances as a solo crime fighter: once fighting poachers in India and once fighting against the techno-psycho criminal Admiral Cerebrus. She was a reluctant hero until the Justice League of America was reorganized by Aquaman. She applied for full-time League membership and was accepted. During her time with the JLA, the totem was taken from her by General Maksai, who still sought its power. The totem would only grant its full power to those who would use it to protect the innocent, and it caused Maksai to be transformed into a raging beast. Maksai died in battle with Vixen. When the team faced the killer android Amazo, Vixen and several of her teammates were beaten into unconsciousness and then left bound and gagged in a walled-off pit. Vixen saved the lives of herself and her fellow Leaguers by using her powers to shatter her bonds and dig to freedom. Vixen continued with that particular incarnation of the JLA until two members were killed, Steel and Vibe, and it was disbanded by the Martian Manhunter. Vixen's connection to the "Red" also allows her to combine the abilities of multiple animals, once holding onto the morphogenetic traits of an entire forest.  

Vixen's claws/nails are particularly sharp and tough, enabling her to rend through a variety of substances, such as fabric, wood, cinder block and even soft metals with ease. Her claws are magically enhanced and have drawn blood from individuals who are considered highly resistant to damage or near invulnerable like Geo-Force, Despero, and Pre-Crisis Superman.

Occasionally, she has been known to physically transform into animals—for example, she has shapeshifted into a gray wolf, a great horned owl, and a cougar. Vixen can also assume a hybrid form, in which she maintains her humanoid form but with certain animal adaptations, like when she took on the gills, fins, and missing eyes of a blind cavefish in JSA Classified and later shapeshifted into a humanoid wolf (retaining the cave fish's blindness).  Vixen also has the ability to communicate with animals and can override the natural predator/prey instinct found in most wild animals.

While the full extent of Vixen's control over the morphogenetic field is unknown, she has on occasion drawn pure energy from it and displayed this energy as a force field and energy constructions. While in cooperation with Animal Man and the woman known as Tristess, she helped to create an entire universe.

It is unknown what would happen if Vixen tried to use her magical abilities on an alien animal, or if she would gain access to the morphogenetic field of another planet. While assisting Hawkgirl during a mission on a distant planet, she was able to access her abilities. During the time when Vixen was mimicking human abilities, she was able to mimic the extraterrestrial abilities of Superman. This might indicate that she is able to mimic the abilities of aliens as long as she is aware of them. One apparent drawback of Vixen's powers is that she is not always able to control the inputs from the morphogenetic field. Sometimes, she has absorbed unwanted animal behavior, such as instinctive rage or killing frenzy.  The longer she stays in contact with the morphogenetic field, the less human and more animal she seems to become.

Vixen wears a mystic artifact called the Tantu Totem, a fox-head shaped talisman given to her ancestors by the African trickster god Anansi. It was previously thought that the totem was the source of her powers but later stories, have shown that it merely prevents the morphogenetic field from overwhelming her mind. It can be assumed that the totem increased her natural mimicking range of 150 feet to worldwide, as she has been seen taking on the traits of animals from around the world. The full capability of the totem is unknown but Vixen once used the magic of the totem to heal bruises and wounds within seconds by simply touching it. The power of the totem has also allowed Vixen to tap into the Red and make mental contact with the "Wishers", a group of people around the world who were granted wishes by the Queen of Fable. 

After losing the totem, Vixen was forced to tap into the human template as a way to purge herself of pure animalistic sensations and regain her humanity. Afterward, Vixen is left with a crippled connection with the morphogenetic field, unable to reach any animal except the human animal. In this state she shows the ability to mimic metahuman powers, such as Jay Garrick's speed, Geo-Force's earth-based powers, and Black Lightning's elemental control, as well as the Kryptonian superpowers of Superman, an extraterrestrial. Her abilities are not only limited to that of metahumans, as she was able to duplicate Red Arrow's archery skills and even Green Lantern's ring in an issue of Justice League of America, suggesting that she gained powers similar to those of Amazo. It is revealed that this is actually trickery on the part of Anansi the Spider God. Upon confronting him within the Tantu Totem, Anansi restores Vixen’s animal powers. For unknown reason, Anansi has made the Tantu Totem his current home and considers Vixen’s family the custodians and guardians of the totem. While Mari doesn't need to wear the totem to use her powers, she is expected to keep it safe for Anansi.

Other versions

Flashpoint
In the alternate timeline of the Flashpoint event, Vixen is a member of Wonder Woman's Furies and one of the former lovers of industrialist Oliver Queen. Vixen and Oliver have a daughter who tries to assassinate her father, but is killed by his security team.

Earth-23
An alternate version of Vixen is shown as part of the Justice League of Earth-23, a world in which black superheroes hold prominence in the superhero community.

DC Bombshells
In the DC Bombshells continuity set in World War II, she is a lesbian, and helps the Bombshells with her lover, Hawkgirl, who is a technological genius and archaeologist.

In other media

Television

 Vixen appears in Justice League Unlimited, voiced by Gina Torres. This version is a member of the Justice League and in a relationship with Green Lantern.
 Vixen appears in Batman: The Brave and the Bold, voiced by Cree Summer. This version is in a relationship with B'wana Beast.
 Vixen makes cameo appearances in Teen Titans Go!.
 Vixen appears in Justice League Action, voiced by Jasika Nicole.

Arrowverse

Characters inspired by Vixen appear in series set in the Arrowverse

 Mari McCabe / Vixen appears in an animated self-titled web series, voiced Megalyn Echikunwoke while Kimberly Brooks voices her younger self. This version hails from Detroit, Michigan.
 Mari also appears in the live-action TV series Arrow episode "Taken", portrayed by Megalyn Echikunwoke. By this time, she has become an experienced vigilante with extensive knowledge of mysticism, which she uses to assist Oliver Queen and his team in fighting Damien Darhk.
 Mari also appears in the second season of the animated web series Freedom Fighters: The Ray.
 Mari's grandmother and previous holder of the Vixen mantle, Amaya Jiwe, appears as a series regular in the second and third seasons of the live-action TV series Legends of Tomorrow, portrayed by Maisie Richardson-Sellers. Initially a member of the Justice Society of America, she was in a relationship with team leader Rex Tyler / Hourman before he is killed by the Reverse-Flash and joins the Legends to avenge Tyler. Throughout her time with the Legends, she enters a new relationship with teammate Nate Heywood, defeats the Reverse-Flash and the Legion of Doom, forms a bond with Zari Tomaz due to their use of Zambezi totems, clashes with her granddaughter and McCabe's sister Kuasa McCabe, and joins forces with her future daughter Esi to save their village from being destroyed in 1992. As a result of Jiwe's changes to the timeline, Mari and Kuasa share the Tantu Totem. By the end of the third season, Jiwe returns to her village in 1942.

Film
 A villainous, alternate universe incarnation of Vixen named Vamp makes a non-speaking appearance in Justice League: Crisis on Two Earths as a member of the Crime Syndicate.
 Vixen appears in Green Lantern: Beware My Power, voiced by Keesha Sharp.

Video games
 Vixen appears in DC Universe Online.
 Vixen appears as a playable character in Lego Batman 2: DC Super Heroes.
 Vixen appears as a playable character in Lego Batman 3: Beyond Gotham via DLC.
 Vixen appears as a "premier skin" for the Cheetah in Injustice 2, voiced again by Megalyn Echikunwoke.
 Vixen appears as a playable character in Lego DC Super-Villains, voiced again by Megalyn Echikunwoke.

Miscellaneous
 The Justice League Unlimited incarnation of Vixen appears in a flashback in Justice League Beyond #7, in which she is murdered by the Shadow Thief on the night that Green Lantern planned to propose to her.
 Vixen appears in DC Super Hero Girls, voiced again by Kimberly Brooks. This version works as a volunteer at the Metropolis Zoo.
 Vixen appears in the Injustice 2 prequel comic as an associate of Ra's al Ghul and Animal Man.
 Vixen appears in the Harley Quinn tie-in comic Harley Quinn: The Animated Series: The Eat. Bang! Kill Tour, in which she initially clashes with before eventually befriending Harley Quinn and Poison Ivy.

See also
 African characters in comics

References

External links
 World of Black Heroes: Vixen Biography
 The Unofficial Vixen Biography
 Unpublished Vixen #1 from Cancelled Comics Cavalcade
 Vixen—JLA Watchtower Profile
 Vixen—JLU Profile (World’s Finest)
 Vixen—JLU Profile (Burning Knights)
 The original Australian Vixen comic book creation. Created in 1970

African superheroes
African-American superheroes
Characters created by Bob Oksner
Characters created by Gerry Conway
Comics characters introduced in 1981
DC Comics female superheroes
DC Comics martial artists
DC Comics metahumans
DC Comics orphans
DC Comics characters who are shapeshifters
DC Comics characters who can move at superhuman speeds
DC Comics characters who use magic
DC Comics characters with accelerated healing
DC Comics characters with superhuman senses
DC Comics characters with superhuman strength
Fictional characters with energy-manipulation abilities
Fictional characters with healing abilities
Fictional therianthropes
Fictional conservationists and environmentalists
Fictional Ghanaian people
Fictional immigrants to the United States
Fictional models
Mythology in DC Comics
Vigilante characters in comics